Coleophora statherota is a moth of the family Coleophoridae. It is found in the central mountainous area of Sri Lanka.

References

External links

statherota
Moths of Asia
Endemic fauna of Sri Lanka
Moths described in 1917